The Khel Ratna Award, officially known as the Major Dhyan Chand Khel Ratna Award ( Major Dhyan Chand Sport Jewel Award), is the highest sporting honour of India. It is awarded annually by the Ministry of Youth Affairs and Sports, Government of India.

The recipient(s) is/are selected by a committee constituted by the Ministry and is honoured for their "spectacular and most outstanding performance in the field of sports over a period of four years" at international level.

Instituted in 1991–1992, the award was given for the performance by a sportsperson in a year. Based on the suggestions provided by 2014 award selection committee, the Ministry revised the criteria in February 2015 to consider the performance over a period of four years. The nominations for a given year are accepted till 30 April or last working day of April with not more than two sportspersons nominated for each sports discipline. A twelve-member committee evaluates the performances of a sportsperson at various International events like Olympic Games, Paralympic Games, Asian Games, and Commonwealth Games. The committee later submits their recommendations to the Union Minister of Youth Affairs and Sports for further approval. The award from 1991-2021 was named after Rajiv Gandhi (1944-1991), former Prime Minister of India.

The award since August 6, 2021 is named after Major Dhyan Chand (1905–79), an Indian field hockey player, widely regarded as one of the greatest field hockey players of all time, who scored more than 1000 goals over a career that spanned over 20 years from 1926 to 1948.

The first recipient of the award was Chess Grandmaster Viswanathan Anand, who was honoured for the performance in the year 1991–92. In 2001, sport shooter Abhinav Bindra, then aged 18, became the youngest recipient of the award.

Usually conferred upon only one sportsperson in a year, a few exceptions have been made (1993–1994, 2002, 2009, 2012, and 2016–2021) when multiple recipients were awarded in a year.

, there have been fifty eight recipients from fifteen sport disciplines: Athletics, Badminton, Billiards, Boxing, Chess, Cricket, Field hockey, Gymnastics, Para Athletics, Para-badminton, Para Shooting, Shooting, Snooker, Table Tennis, Tennis, Wrestling, Weightlifting, and Yacht racing.

Nominations

The nominations for the award are received from all government recognised National Sports Federations, the Indian Olympic Association, the Sports Authority of India (SAI), the Sports Promotion and Control Boards, and the state and the union territory governments with not more than two eligible sportspersons nominated for each sports discipline. In case of cricket, the nominations are received from the Board of Control for Cricket in India and SAI is authorised to submit the nominations on behalf of all the de-recognised or under suspension National Sports Federations. The previous award recipients can also nominate one sportsperson for the discipline for which they themselves were awarded. The Government can nominate up to two sportspersons in deserving cases where no such nominations have been received from the nominating authorities. The nominations for a given year are accepted till 30 April or last working day of April.

Selection process

All the received nominations are sent to SAI and National Anti-Doping Agency for the verification against the claimed achievements and doping clearance respectively. Any sportsperson who is either penalised or being enquired for usage of drugs or substances banned by the World Anti-Doping Agency is not eligible for the award. A committee consisting of the Joint Secretary and the Director/Deputy Secretary of Department of Sports, the Secretary and the Executive Director/Director (TEAMS) of SAI verify and validate the nominations.

The valid nominations are placed before the selection committee constituted by the Government. This twelve member committee consists of a Chairperson nominated by the Ministry, four Olympians or previous recipients of  Khel Ratna or Arjuna Award, three sports journalists/experts/commentators, one sportsperson/expert/administrator associated with parasports, one sports administrator, the Director General of SAI, and the Joint Secretary of Department of Sports, with not more than one sportsperson from a particular discipline included in the committee. When instituted in 1991–92, the award was given for the performance by a sportsperson in a year. Based on the suggestions provided by 2014 award selection committee headed by Kapil Dev, the Ministry revised the criteria in February 2015 to consider the performance over a period of four years.

The medals won in various International championships and events of the disciplines which include Summer and Winter Olympic and Paralympics Games, Asian Games, and Commonwealth Games are given 80% weightage. The remaining 20% weightage is given to the profile and standard of the events. For any other games not included in Olympic, Asian Games, and Commonwealth Games like cricket and indigenous games, the individuals performance of a sportsperson is taken into consideration. The sportsperson with maximum points is given 80 marks. Rest of the sportspersons are given marks in proportion to the maximum points. For team events, marks are given as per the strength of the team. Following are the points defined for medals at the given events:

For a given discipline, not more than two sportspersons, one male and one female, are given highest marks. The committee may not recommend the award to the sportsperson with the highest marks across disciplines but can only recommend the recipient of the highest aggregate marks in a particular sports discipline. The recommendations of the selection committee are submitted to the Union Minister of Youth Affairs and Sports for further approval.

List

Controversies
The 2002 selection committee, headed by former football player Pradip Kumar Banerjee made twenty one recommendations for the Arjuna Award and two recommendations for the Major Dhyan Chand Khel Ratna Award (then known as the Rajiv Gandhi Khel Ratna Award), athlete K. M. Beenamol and shooter Anjali Bhagwat. The government rejected the recommendations and asked the committee to cut down the list to comply with the award guidelines, where only one sportsperson for the Major Dhyan Chand Khel Ratna Award and fifteen sportspersons along with one disabled athlete for the Arjuna Awards could be recommended each year. The committee revised the list to recommend Beenamol for the award over Bhagwat but also put a request "to consider everyone". The decision spurred criticism for ignoring the achievements of the shooter and Bhagwat and the National Rifle Association of India expressed their "disappointment" with the decision. Later, the government accepted all the recommendations "as an exception" and jointly awarded Beenamol and Bhagwat for the year 2002.

In August 2013, the selection committee, headed by Michael Ferreira recommended sport shooter Ronjan Sodhi for the award, with some committee members questioning the process of selection. A committee member noted that discus thrower Krishna Poonia and Paralympic athlete Girisha Nagarajegowda were shortlisted and Sodhi was not the initial choice. However, Girisha's name was removed, and the final voting was done between Sodhi and Poonia. Poonia was accused of lobbying for the award by one of the committee member Anjali Bhagwat, but the accused met the then Union Sports Minister Jitendra Singh to promote her case and also rubbished the lobbying allegations. The Ministry conducted a separate enquiry by Secretary of Department of Sports and decided not to increase the number of awards "to maintain the stature of the awards".

Following an announcement, in August 2015, that tennis player Sania Mirza was to be awarded, a Public-Interest Litigation was filed in the Karnataka High Court. The petitioner, who was again Girisha, mentioned that his performance was ignored by the committee. Girisha claimed to be a top contender for the award with 90 points, owing to his silver medal winning act at the 2012 Summer Paralympics in the Men's High Jump F42 event. The petition mentioned that the points for Mirza's Grand Slam titles from 2011 until 2015 should not be counted as the events were not a part of the list of sports events to be considered for the performance evaluation. The court withheld the conferment and sought replies from the Ministry about the selection process. The Ministry nevertheless presented the award to Mirza on 29 August 2015 amidst the case processing.

Explanatory notes

References

External links

 

Indian sports trophies and awards
India
Awards established in 1991
India sport-related lists
1991 establishments in India
Ministry of Youth Affairs and Sports